Johann Gottfried von Berger (November 11, 1659 – October 2, 1736) was a German physician and writer on physiology who was an early follower of the iatromechanical explanation of human organ functioning. Berger was born in Halle an der Saale and was educated at Jena (1682) and Leipzig. He became a professor of medicine at the University of Wittenberg and a court physician to King August of Poland. His brother  was also a physician. 

Berger wrote a textbook  (1702) and his writings showed a leaning to iatromechanical theories and Cartesian ideas while opposing older ideas of Galenic humorism and the animism of theorists such as Georg Ernst Stahl. 

Berger was said to have been influenced by the work of Gjuro Armen Baglivi and became party to a controversy over a manuscript of Baglivi's. Meeting in Rome in 1693, Berger suddenly left the city without notice, soon after Baglivi had lent him a number of manuscript pages from a planned work on reconstructive surgery. Although Baglivi feared that Berger would plagiarise it, historiographical investigations have never revealed any evidence of publication of the missing manuscript pages in any form. Why the pages were apparently removed from Rome, and how the dispute was settled is unknown, but by 1698 the two physicians were corresponding and on good terms.

References

External links 
 Physiologia medica, sive de Natura humana liber bipartitus

1659 births
1736 deaths
18th-century German physicians